"Pretty Girl" is a song performed by American contemporary R&B singer Jon B, issued as the second single from his debut studio album Bonafide. The song peaked at #25 on the Billboard Hot 100 in 1995.

Personnel and credits
Credits adapted from album liner notes.

Jon B. - lead vocals, background vocals
Babyface - writer, producer, arranger, background vocals, keyboard, drum programming, midi programming
Brad Gilderman - recording engineer
Marty Ogden – recording engineer
Mick Guzauski - mix engineer

Music video

The official music video for the song was directed by F. Gary Gray.

Chart positions

References

External links
 
 

550 Music singles
1995 songs
1995 singles
1990s ballads
Jon B. songs
Contemporary R&B ballads
Music videos directed by F. Gary Gray
Song recordings produced by Babyface (musician)
Songs written by Babyface (musician)